Opticin is a protein that in humans is encoded by the OPTC gene.

Opticin belongs to class III of the small leucine-rich repeat protein (SLRP) family. Members of this family are typically associated with the extracellular matrix. Opticin is present in significant quantities in the vitreous of the eye and also localizes to the cornea, iris, ciliary body, optic nerve, choroid, retina, and fetal liver. Opticin may noncovalently bind collagen fibrils and regulate fibril morphology, spacing, and organization. The opticin gene is mapped to a region of chromosome 1 that is associated with the inherited eye diseases age-related macular degeneration (AMD) and posterior column ataxia with retinosa pigmentosa (AXPC1).

References

Further reading

Proteoglycans